Abe Springs is an unincorporated community in Calhoun County, Florida, United States. It is located along County Road 275 south of State Road 20 and northwest of State Road 71.

References

Unincorporated communities in Calhoun County, Florida
Unincorporated communities in Florida
Former county seats in Florida